Eudryas is a genus of moths of the family Noctuidae.

Species
The genus includes the following species:
 Eudryas brevipennis Stretch, 1872
 Eudryas grata – beautiful wood nymph Fabricius, 1793
 Eudryas unio – pearly wood nymph Hübner, [1831]

References
 Eudryas at Markku Savela's Lepidoptera and Some Other Life Forms
 Natural History Museum Lepidoptera genus database

Agaristinae